The following is a list of notable events and releases that happened in Scandinavian music in 2022. (Go to last year in Scandinavian music or next year in Scandinavian music.)

Events
7 January – US-born Finnish violinist Elina Vähälä gives the first North American performance of the original 1904 version of Sibelius's Violin Concerto, with the Minnesota Orchestra under Finnish conductor Osmo Vänskä. 
1 February 
 The Royal Danish Orchestra announces that Marie Jacquot will be its next music director, effective with the 2024-2025 season, with an initial contract of 5 years. She is the first female conductor ever appointed to the post. 
 The Norwegian National Opera and Ballet announces the appointment of Edward Gardner to the post of artistic advisor as its next music director.
12 March – Melodifestivalen 2022 is won by Cornelia Jakobs with "Hold Me Closer"; at the Eurovision Song Contest 2022, it would finish fourth.
5 April – It is announced that Santtu-Matias Rouvali will end his tenure as chief conductor of the Tampere Philharmonic Orchestra at the end of the 2022-2023 season.
12 April – Jukka-Pekka Saraste is appointed as the next chief conductor of the Helsinki Philharmonic Orchestra on a three-year contract effective with the 2023-2024 season.
3 May – Swedish doom metal band Draconian change their line-up, with the departure of singer Heike Langhans and the return of Lisa Johansson on vocals, as well as the addition of Niklas Nord on guitars.
27 May – The ABBA Voyage concert residency, with band members as virtual avatars, opens in London. The band make a personal appearance at the end of the first show. 
29-30 July – The Uppsala Reggae Festival is scheduled to take place in Finland. Artists expected to appear include Max Romeo, Morgan Heritage and Gentleman.
July – A version of Swedish band Ghost's 2019 song "Mary on a Cross" goes viral on TikTok. The band releases its own slowed-down version of the song, which tops the Billboard Hot Hard Rock streaming songs chart, and reaches the Hot 100 chart, their first such success.
20 September – The Tampere Philharmonic Orchestra announces that Matthew Halls will replace Santtu-Matias Rouvali as its chief conductor with an initial contract of 3 years.
3 November – Hannu Lintu is appointed chief conductor of the Gulbenkian Orchestra, effective with the 2023-2024 season.
 30 November – Norway's Kristiansand Symphony Orchestra announces the appointment of Julian Rachlin as its next chief conductor, in succession to Nathalie Stutzmann.

Albums released

January

February

March

April

May

June

July

August

September

October

November

Eurovision Song Contest
 Denmark in the Eurovision Song Contest 2022
 Finland in the Eurovision Song Contest 2022
 Iceland in the Eurovision Song Contest 2022
 Norway in the Eurovision Song Contest 2022
 Sweden in the Eurovision Song Contest 2022

Classical works
 Hildur Guðnadóttir – The Fact of the Matter
 Mats Larsson Gothe and Susanne Marko – Löftet (opera)
 Jaakko Kuusisto – Symphony, Op. 39 (completed by Pekka Kuusisto)
 Ville Raasakka – The Harvest, for chamber orchestra
 Anna S. Þorvaldsdóttir – ARCHORA
 Sauli Zinovjev – Piano Concerto

Film and television music
Hildur Guðnadóttir - Women Talking
Johan Söderqvist - Anatomy of a Scandal

Deaths
18 January – Paavo Heininen, Finnish composer, 84
25 January – Fredrik Johansson, Swedish guitarist, 47 (cancer)
20 February – Nils Lindberg, Swedish composer and pianist, 88
23 February – Jaakko Kuusisto, Finnish composer, conductor and violinist, 48 (brain cancer)
22 March – , Norwegian singer, guitarist and songwriter, 50
9 April – Birgit Nordin, Swedish operatic soprano, 88
9 April – Trygve Thue, Norwegian guitarist and producer, 71
6 May – Alf Hambe, Swedish writer, composer and singer-songwriter, 91
10 May – Kjell Lönnå, Swedish choirmaster, conductor and composer, 85
18 July – Povl Dissing, Danish singer, composer, guitarist, and harmonica player, 84
6 August – Torgny Söderberg, Swedish songwriter, 77
9 August – Jussi Hakulinen, Finnish musician and singer-songwriter, 57
10 August – Vesa-Matti Loiri, Finnish actor and musician, 77
15 August – Hans (Hasse) Magnusson, Swedish saxophonist, 73
16 August – Matti Lehtinen, Finnish baritone, 100
August – Kimmo Blom, Finnish rock singer and musician, 52 (cancer)
14 September (death announced on this date) – David Andersson, 47, Swedish heavy metal guitarist (Soilwork)
5 October – Ann-Christine Nyström, 78, Finnish Eurovision singer
30 October (death announced on this date) – Ryan Karazija, 40, American-Icelandic musician (Low Roar)
9 November – Mattis Hætta, 63, Norwegian Sami singer
1 December – Tord Sjöman, 82, Swedish organist (Vikingarna).
3 December – Svenne Hedlund, 77, Swedish pop singer
26 December – Lars Lönndahl, 94, Swedish singer ("The Swedish Frank Sinatra")

References

Scandinavian
Scandinavian culture